Kaanchi is a 2013 Indian Malayalam-language action drama film directed by G. N. Krishnakumar and starring Indrajith Sukumaran, Murali Gopy, and Maria John.

Plot
The film follows the life of grocery store owner Madhavan.

Cast 
 Indrajith Sukumaran as Madhavan
 Murali Gopy as Peringodan Narayanan
 Maria John as Gowri
 P. Balachandran as Madhavan's father
 Joy Mathew as Narayanan's arch rival
 Shine Tom Chacko as Vijayan
 Chemban Vinod Jose as Perachan
 Sathaar as Krishna Pillai
 Sunil Sukhada
 Krishnan Pattambi
 Devi Ajith as Rukhmini

Production 
Krishnakumar, who directed Indrajith in College Days (2010), directs this film. Indrajith, Murali Gopy, and Red Wine Maria John play the lead roles. The film is written by B. Jeyamohan, who previously wrote Ozhimuri (2012).

Reception 
A critic from Sify wrote that "Kaanchi is like a cold glass of coffee that you find on your bedside as you get up on a cool morning. You can have it, but it won't give you any particular feeling. Decide on your own, if you want it or to go for some sparkling hot cup that will make you feel fresh!". Paresh Palincha of Rediff.com opined that "Kaanchi, despite its star duo of Indrajith and Murali Gopy, and a script by Jeyamohan, falls far short of expectations". Aswin J Kumar of The Times of India stated that "Kaanchi even throws up moments where a gifted story-teller like Jeyamohan seems doubtful of his own plot, something that hinders the plot".

Box office
The film was a box office failure.

References

External links

2013 films
2013 action drama films
Indian action drama films
2010s Malayalam-language films